Từ điển bách khoa Việt Nam (Literally Encyclopaedic Dictionary of Vietnam)  is a state-sponsored Vietnamese language encyclopedia that was published in Vietnam in 2005.

It is the first state encyclopedia of the Socialist Republic of Vietnam. The compilation process began in 1987 and was completed in 2005. The first edition, published in 2005 by Vietnam's Encyclopedia Publishing House, has four volumes consisting of 40,000 entries. Arranged by Vietnamese-alphabet order, the encyclopedia covers topics from historical to child rearing. Since then, it has been converted to electronic versions (CD and ebook) and a free online version.

See also

Vietnamese encyclopedias

References

External links
 Từ điển Bách khoa toàn thư Việt Nam

Vietnamese encyclopedias
2005 non-fiction books
Vietnamese-language encyclopedias
Vietnam
Vietnamese online encyclopedias
21st-century encyclopedias